Beat Schwerzmann (born 28 April 1966) is a Swiss rower. His wife Ingeburg is also a successful rower.

References 
 
 

1966 births
Living people
Swiss male rowers
Olympic rowers of Switzerland
Rowers at the 1988 Summer Olympics
Rowers at the 1992 Summer Olympics
Olympic silver medalists for Switzerland
Olympic medalists in rowing
World Rowing Championships medalists for Switzerland
Medalists at the 1988 Summer Olympics